Middletown High School is a public high school in Middletown, Ohio.  It is the only public high school in the Middletown City School District.

The present location of the school was established in the fall of 1969, being moved from its original location at 1415 Girard Avenue. The old high school was converted to Middletown Middle School for the remainder of its life until it was demolished in September 2018.

In 2016, a $96 million renovation project began on the high school, updating the building and arena, as well as adding a new middle school building adjacent to it. The new Wade E. Miller Arena was completed and opened in December 2017, and the rest of the building, as well as the new middle school, officially opened in August 2018.

Ohio High School Athletic Association State Championships

 Boys Basketball – 1944, 1946, 1947, 1952, 1953, 1956, 1957. The Middies' seven boys basketball state championships was the most of any High School in Ohio until Akron St. Vincent-St. Mary broke the record with their eighth championship in 2018.
 Boys Cross Country – 2004 
 Boys Track and Field – 2002

Notable alumni
 Todd Bell – Pro Bowl safety in the NFL during the 1980s
 Butch Carter – Former NBA player and head coach, and brother of NFL hall of famer Cris Carter
 Cris Carter – NFL Hall of Fame inductee and a member of the NFL 1990s All-Decade Team. NFL analyst, and brother of Butch Carter. 
 Jeff Cothran – (born June 28, 1971, in Middletown, Ohio) Former NFL fullback for the Cincinnati Bengals
 Vincent Edwards – NBA basketball player for the NBA G League Canton Charge of the Cleveland Cavaliers
 Kayla Harrison – First woman to win a gold medal in Judo for USA(2012 London Olympics)
 Jerry Lucas – NBA Hall of Famer, NBA champion, Olympic gold medalist.
 Jalin Marshall – CFL & NFL Wide Receiver
 Clarence Page – Pulitzer Prize winner, journalist, syndicated columnist and member of the editorial board for the Chicago Tribune
 Kyle Schwarber – Current MLB outfielder for the Philadelphia Phillies
 Dave Swartzbaugh – Former MLB pitcher for the Chicago Cubs
 J. D. Vance – U.S. Senator from Ohio, author of the bestselling semi-autobiographical book, Hillbilly Elegy
 John M. Watson, Sr. – Musician, educator, film and stage actor

Notes and references

External links
District website

Middletown, Ohio
High schools in Butler County, Ohio
Public high schools in Ohio